This article lists all of the numbered roads in Chatham-Kent, Ontario. Some older road signs (before 1998) still exist on roadsides that still say "Kent County", while newer ones say "C-K Road" instead.  Since 2014, Chatham-Kent has re-rehabilitated its busier, former King's Highways to a better standard, and upgraded their speed limits in rural areas to 90 km/h from 80 km/h.

References 

Chatham-Kent
Roads in Chatham-Kent
Chatham-Kent